The Shell River  is a river in western Manitoba. It flows south from its source in Duck Mountain Provincial Park at the confluence of the East Shell River and West Shell River, to its mouth in Asessippi Provincial Park at the Lake of the Prairies where it joins the Assiniboine River.

The river was originally a meltwater channel resulting from the melting of the Keewatin Ice Flow, part of Laurentide Ice Sheet more than ten thousand years ago. The modern day Shell River is much smaller and meanders within the large valley created by its glacier fed predecessor. It is an example of a misfit stream, where a river occupies a river channel that does not match its size.

The river is bridged by:
PR 367
PR 594
PR 584
PR 591
PTH 5
PR 583
PTH 83

The community of Shevlin is located on the Shell River east of Roblin where the river is bridged by the rail line.

The Shell River Valley trail in Duck Mountain Provincial Park explores the forested areas of the river's source. The Shell River Loop in Asessippi Provincial Park explores the valley bottom near its mouth. The river's lower reaches are suitable for canoeing.

See also
List of Manitoba rivers

References

External links
 Shell River, Manitoba
 Real-Time Hydrometric Data Graph for Shell River near Inglis (05MD005) [MB]

Rivers of Manitoba
Bodies of water of Parkland Region, Manitoba
Tributaries of the Assiniboine River